Niederschönenfeld is a municipality in the district of Donau-Ries in Bavaria in Germany. It lies on the river Danube.

Mayors
1978–1996: Johann Höringer
1996–2002: Manfred Rümmer
2002–2020: Peter Mahl
since 2020: Stefan Roßkopf

Penal institution Niederschönfeld
The prison exists since 1862. It is the biggest employer in Niederschönenfeld. There is room for 261 prisoners.

Famous prisoners:
 Hans Beimler (1921–1923)
 Erich Mühsam (1920–1924)
 Ernst Toller (1920–1924)

References

Donau-Ries
Populated places on the Danube